Hindowa Batilo Momoh (born in Kailahun, Sierra Leone) is Sierra Leonean former radical youth activist and former President of the National Union of Sierra Leone Students. Hindowa was born a brought up in Kailahun, Kailahun District, in the Eastern Province of Sierra Leone. Hindowa received his Ph.D. in African Studies from Howard University in 2004. He was a member of the National Electoral Commission in the recent general election held on August 11, and September 17, 2007.

External links 
 http://news.sl/drwebsite/publish/article_20057105.shtml

References 

Living people
Year of birth missing (living people)
People from Kailahun District